Pseudastylopsis is a genus of longhorn beetles of the subfamily Lamiinae. It was described by Dillon in 1956.

Species
 Pseudastylopsis nebulosus (Horn, 1880)
 Pseudastylopsis nelsoni Linsley and Chemsak, 1995
 Pseudastylopsis pini (Schaeffer, 1905)
 Pseudastylopsis squamosus Chemsak & Linsley, 1986

References

Acanthocinini